Respect Me may refer to:

Respect Me (Tinga Stewart album), 1989
Respect M.E., a 2006 album by Missy Elliott
Respect Me (Lil' Flip album), 2009
"Respect Me", a song by 50 Cent
"Respect Me", a song by Dizzee Rascal from his 2004 album Showtime